The Canadian province of Newfoundland and Labrador held municipal elections in its municipalities on September 29, 2009.

Listed are the results of selected municipal mayoral races in the province.

Bay Roberts

Clarenville

Conception Bay South

Mayoral

City council

Corner Brook

Mayoral

City Council
(6 to be elected)

City Council By-Election 2011
(To replace the seat vacated by Charlie Renouf)

Daniel's Harbour

Mayoral

Elected City Council

Gander

Grand Falls-Windsor

Happy Valley-Goose Bay

Mayoral

City Council

Labrador City

Marystown

Mount Pearl

Mayoral

City council
(6 to be elected)

Paradise

A subsequent recount (exact tally unknown) showed both candidates tied. Pursuant to the province's Municipal Elections Act, this resulted in a random draw, which resulted in Wiseman being chosen as the winner. However, Coombs made a request for a judicial recount. The judicial recount confirmed that it was indeed a tie; this led the first random draw to stand and Ralph Wiseman to stay Mayor.

Initial count:

Pasadena

Portugal Cove-St. Philip's

St. John's

Mayoral

Deputy Mayor

City Council

Stephenville

Torbay

References

External links
CBC - Newfoundland and Labrador municipal elections - 2009

2009 elections in Canada
2009
2009 in Newfoundland and Labrador